The Police Stadium is a cricket ground in Chamba, Himachal Pradesh, India.  The first recorded match on the ground came when Himachal Pradesh Under-19s played Haryana Under-19s in 1995.  The ground held its first first-class match in December 1995 when Himachal Pradesh played Jammu and Kashmir in the 1995/96 Ranji Trophy.  The following season a further first-class match was held when Himachal Pradesh played Haryana in the 1996/97 Ranji Trophy.  Three seasons later the ground held a third first-class match between Himachal Pradesh and Jammu and Kashmir in the 1999/00 Ranji Trophy.  Three List A matches have also been held on the ground, with the first coming in the 1995/96 Ranji Trophy one-day competition when Himachal Pradesh played Jammu and Kashmir.  The others followed when Himachal Pradesh played Haryana in the 1996/97 competition and when Himachal Pradesh played Jammu and Kashmir in the 1999/00 competition.  No further major matches have been staged there.

References

External links
Police Stadium at ESPNcricinfo
Police Stadium at CricketArchive

Cricket grounds in Himachal Pradesh
Chamba, Himachal Pradesh
Defunct cricket grounds in India
Buildings and structures in Chamba district
1995 establishments in Himachal Pradesh
Sports venues completed in 1995
20th-century architecture in India